Round Island Light may refer to:
 Round Island Light, Isles of Scilly, England, UK
 Round Island Light, Michigan, U.S.
 Round Island Light, Mississippi, U.S.
 Round Island Light, Sri Lanka